Hobah was a biblical place mentioned only in Genesis 14:15. When Abraham (then Abram) rescued his nephew Lot, the biblical account relates that he pursued his captors as far north as Hobah. He pursued the four Kings who had pillaged Sodom and Gomorrah. It is said to be north of Damascus in the Bible. It is mentioned in the aftermath of the Battle of Siddim. Although suggestions have been made for the exact location of Hobah, it is unknown.

The Genesis Apocryphon renders this name as Helbon, thus identifying it with the city mentioned in Ezekiel 27:18.

See also 
 Battle of Siddim
 Lot (biblical person)

References 

Hebrew Bible places